Hope is the second album by the Canadian rock band Klaatu and their first concept album. Released in September 1977, it won a Juno Award for "Best Engineered Album" and a Canadian Music Critics award for "Best Album" that same year. The album follows the loose concept of space travelers visiting a distant planet.

An alternate version of Hope was released in 2005 as part of the group's Sun Set collection of rarities. The alternate version on Sun Set includes the complete contributions of the London Symphony Orchestra, which had largely been removed from the version released in 1977. The alternate version also includes a short unreleased track, "Epilogue," which had originally been intended to be placed between "So Said the Lighthouse Keeper" and "Hope."

Hope was remastered and re-issued in 2012 by the band's members, and was released on the band's independent record label Klaatunes.

Musical style

A reviewer for Julian Cope's Head Heritage described Hope as “an elaborate sci-fi prog opera, while an article in the Edmonton Journal described a “whimsical space-rock album”. Allmusic's Mike DeGagne commented that the album was "less pop-infused" than the group's previous album 3:47 EST, and contained more "progressive depth" with an "experimental sound". Peter Kurtz of the website felt that the album's conceptual rock opera theme sounded "pretentious, and in some cases like a rip-off of Queen". Billboard described the songs as ranging from "fun light pop" similar to 10cc, to "theatrical melodramas" similar to Queen, and to well-orchestrated ballads similar to the Moody Blues.

PopMatters described the song “Around the Universe in 80 Days” as a “powerful pop ballad” with a “gorgeous piano melody”, and a “fine example of effortless pop-rock craftsmanship”. It described “Prelude” as “an instrumental rock epic”.

Artwork 
Like the previous Klaatu album, the cover was painted by graphic artist Ted Jones.

The cover shows "the Lighthouse Keeper's beam". The ruined stone plaza features the sun image from the cover of the previous Klaatu album.

Track listing
Side one

Side two

The album opens with a mouse squeak. Their previous album, 3:47 EST, ends with a mouse squeak. The cover art for each album features a mouse.

The original release credited all songs simply to "Klaatu"; however, subsequent reissues and the band's website provided individual song writing credits.

Personnel
Klaatu
Dee Long - vocals, piano, electric guitar, acoustic guitar, organ, clavinet, bass guitar, synthesizer, mandolin, slide guitar, harmonica, electric sitar
John Woloschuk - vocals, bass guitar, Fender Rhodes piano, autoharp, acoustic guitar, piano, organ, Polymoog synthesizer, harmonium, electric piano, pianet
Terry Draper - drums, tambourine, triangle, percussion, whistle

Additional
London Symphony Orchestra

Production
Arranged & produced by Klaatu & Terry Brown
Recorded & engineered by Terry Brown

The band members are not named on the original LP.

References

External links
"Hope" at discogs

Klaatu (band) albums
1977 albums
Albums produced by Terry Brown (record producer)
Capitol Records albums
Science fiction concept albums